Shaheed ("The Martyr") is a 1948 Bollywood Indian romance film, written and directed by Ramesh Saigal. The film depicts India's struggle for independence. It starred Dilip Kumar, Kamini Kaushal, Chandra Mohan, and Leela Chitnis. It had music by Ghulam Haider. Shaheed was the highest grossing Indian movie of 1948.

This was actor Chandra Mohan's last screen appearance. He had earlier appeared in Pukar, directed by Sohrab Modi, Humayun and Roti, both directed by Mehboob Khan, and Stree, directed by V. Shantaram.

Plot
Circa 1940s India, a young freedom fighter Ram [Dilip Kumar] faces opposition from his own father Raibahadur Dwarakadas [Chandra Mohan] as well as an ambitious police officer Vinod [Ram Singh], who is also his rival for affection of a mutual childhood sweetheart Sheila [Kamini Kaushal].

Cast
 Dilip Kumar as Ram
 Kamini Kaushal as Sheela
 Chandra Mohan as Rai Bahadur Dwarkadas
 Leela Chitnis as Mrs. Dwarkadas
 V. H. Desai as Hemant Rai
 S. L. Puri
 Ram Singh as Vinod
 Prabhu Dayal as Gopal 
 Raj Adib
 Shashi Kapoor as Young Ram
 N. Kabir as Young Vinod
 Baby Anwari as Young Sheela

Soundtrack
The music composed by Ghulam Haider, while lyrics written by Raja Mehdi Ali Khan and Qamar Jalalabadi. Songs like "Watan ki Raah Mein Watan Ke Naujawan Shaheed Ho" and "Badnaam Na Ho Jaaye Mohabbat Ka Fasana" have gained their popularity even after 60 years of the film's release.

References

External links
Movie posters from Shaheed featured in the Cinema India exhibition at the V&A
 

1948 films
1940s Hindi-language films
Films set in the Indian independence movement
Indian black-and-white films
Indian romantic drama films
1948 romantic drama films
Films directed by Ramesh Saigal